Thaluta is a genus of small sea snail, marinegastropod mollusk in the family Costellariidae, the ribbed miters.

Species
Species within the genus Thaluta include:

 Thaluta maxmarrowi
 Thaluta takenoko

References

Costellariidae